Cartoons on the Bay is an international festival held in Italy dedicated to television-, film- and transmedia- animation. The Pulcinella Awards are presented at the festival for excellence in animation production. Its purpose is to promote the activity of authors and producers from all over the world, offering an opportunity to meet with buyers, distributors and television managers. It is organised by the public service broadcaster RAI. The festival has been staged in Amalfi, Salerno, Rapallo, Santa Margherita Ligure, Portofino, Positano, Venice and Turin.

References

External links
 

1995 establishments in Italy
Awards established in 1995
Italian animation
Animation film festivals
Italian television awards
Italian film awards
Film festivals in Italy